Venable Tobacco Company Prizery and Receiving Room is a historic tobacco prizery located at Durham, Durham County, North Carolina.  The prizery was built about 1930, and is a three-story, brick building.  The trapezoidal shaped, one-story, concrete block receiving room was added in 1952. It is an example of "slow burn" masonry and wood factory construction. The prizery is located adjacent to the Venable Tobacco Company Warehouse, which collectively are the only structures that remain of a larger complex.

It was listed on the National Register of Historic Places in 2003.

References

Tobacco buildings in the United States
Industrial buildings and structures on the National Register of Historic Places in North Carolina
Industrial buildings completed in 1930
Buildings and structures in Durham, North Carolina
National Register of Historic Places in Durham County, North Carolina